Sreerampur Uttarpara is a community development block that forms an administrative division in Srirampore subdivision of Hooghly district in the Indian state of West Bengal.

Overview
The Sreerampur Uttarpara CD Block is part of the Hooghly Flats, one of the three natural regions in the district of the flat alluvial plains, that forms part of the Gangetic Delta. The region is a narrow strip of land along the 80 km long stretch of the Hooghly River, that forms the eastern boundary of the district. The region has been physiographically influenced by the course of the river. The Hooghly is a tidal river and has a high west bank. The Portuguese, the Dutch, the French, the Danes and the British dominated industry, trade and commerce in this area for more than two centuries, and as a result this belt is highly industrialised.

Geography

Sreerampur Uttarpara CD Block is bounded by Baidyabati Municipality in the north, Serampore Municipality, Rishra Municipality, Konnagar Municipality, Uttarpara Kotrung Municipality, Barrackpore II CD Block in North 24 Parganas district, across the Hooghly, in the east, Bally Jagachha CD Block, in Howrah district, in the south and Chanditala II, Singur and Polba Dadpur CD Blocks in the west.

It is located 29 km from Chinsurah, the district headquarters.

Sreerampur Uttarpara CD Block has an area of 44.8 km2. It has 1 panchayat samity, 6 gram panchayats, 117 gram sansads (village councils), 19 mouzas and 13 inhabited villages. Serampore, Dankuni and Uttarpara police stations serve this block. Headquarters of this CD Block is at Serampore.

Gram panchayats of Sreerampur-Uttarpara block/ panchayat samiti are: Kanaipur, Nabagram, Pearapur, Raghunathpur, Rajyadharpur and Rishra.

Demographics

Population
As per the 2011 Census of India, Serampur Uttarpara CD Block had a total population of 152,266, of which 36,389 were rural and 115,877 were urban. There were 77,725 (51%) males and 74,541 (49%) females. Population below 6 years was 13,794. Scheduled Castes numbered 35,086 (23.04%) and Scheduled Tribes numbered 1,246 (0.82%).

As per the 2001 census, Sreerampur-Uttarpara block had a total population of 126,337, out of which 65,277 were males and 61,060 were females. Sreerampur-Uttarpara block registered a population growth of -3.26% during the 1991-2001 decade. Decadal growth for Hooghly district was 15.72%. Decadal growth in West Bengal was 17.84%.

Census Towns in Sreerampur Uttarpara CD Block are (2011 census figures in brackets): Belumilki (10,998), Dakshin Rajyadharpur (11,254), Rishra (CT) (16,504), Bamunari (6,266), Nawapara (7,262), Nabagram Colony (18,358), Basai (8,772), Kanaipur (26,814) and Raghunathpur (9,650).

Large villages (with 4,000+ population) in Sreerampur Uttarpara CD Block are (2011 census figures in brackets): Piarapur (4,167), Ghoramara (4,284) and Mollarber (6,006).

Other villages in Sreerampur Uttarpara CD Block are (2011 census figures in brackets):  Chapsara (1,435), Uttar Rajyadharpur (1,634), Pandit Satghara (3.087), Simla (3,164), Madpur (815), Bangihati (3,660), Basipota (958), Bhadua (2,236), Mirpur (3,056) and Jagannathpur (1,887).

Literacy
As per the 2011 census, the total number of literates in Sreerampur Uttarpara CD Block was 120,032 (86.68% of the population over 6 years) out of which males numbered 64,513 (91.21% of the male population over 6 years) and females numbered 56,419 (83.28% of the female population over 6 years). The gender disparity (the difference between female and male literacy rates) was 7.93%.

As per the 2001 census, Sreerampur-Uttarpara block had a total literacy of 68.09 per cent. While male literacy was 83.84 per cent, female literacy was 69.91 per cent.

See also – List of West Bengal districts ranked by literacy rate

Language and religion
As per the 2001 census, Bengali is the mother tongue for 86.4% of the population of the district followed by Hindi at 7.9%. Santali at 2.6% and Urdu at 2.0%, are the two other major languages spoken in the district. The population who reported Bengali as a mother tongue has decreased from 88.1% in 1961 to 86.4% in 2001 census whereas the population who reported Hindi as mother tongue has increased from 5.8% in 1961 to 7.9% in 2001 census.

As per the 2011 census, majority of the population of the district belong to the Hindu community with a population share of 82.9% followed by Muslims at 15.8%. The percentage of the Hindu population of the district has followed a decreasing trend from 87.1% in 1961 to 82.9% in the latest census 2011. On the other hand, the percentage of Muslim population has increased from 12.7% in 1961 to 15.8% in 2011 census.

In 2011 census Hindus numbered 137,245 and formed 90.14% of the population in Sreerampur Uttarpara CD Block. Muslims numbered 13,863 and formed 9.10% of the population. Others numbered 1,158 and formed 0.76% of the population.

Rural poverty
As per poverty estimates obtained from household survey for families living below poverty line in 2005, rural poverty in Sreerampur Uttarpara CD Block was 7.59%.

Economy

Livelihood

In Sreerampur Uttarpara CD Block in 2011, amongst the class of total workers, cultivators formed 2.41%, agricultural labourers 3.57%, household industry workers 4.94% and other workers 89.08%.

Infrastructure
There are 13 inhabited villages in Sreerampur Uttarpara CD Block. Amongst all the CD Blocks in Hooghly district Sreerampur Uttarpara CD Block has the lowest number of inhabited villages. 100% villages have power supply. 10 villages have more than one source of drinking water (tap, well, tube well, hand pump), 2 villages had only tube well/ borewell and 1 village had a hand pump only. Only 2 villages have sub post offices. All 13 villages have landlines, 12 villages have public call offices and 13 villages have mobile phone coverage. 10 villages have pucca roads and 10 villages have bus service (public/ private).

Agriculture
In 2013-14, the small percentage of persons engaged in agriculture in Sreerampur Uttarpara CD Block could be classified as follows: bargadars 12.25%, patta (document) holders 3.32%, small farmers (possessing land between 1 and 2 hectares) 0.43%, marginal farmers (possessing land up to 1 hectare) 52.66% and agricultural labourers 31.33%.

Sreerampur Uttarpara CD Block had 18 fertiliser depots, 19 seed stores and 29 fair price shops in 2013-14.

In 2013-14, Sreerampur Uttarpara CD Block produced 773 tonnes of Aman paddy, the main winter crop from 305 hectares, 369 tonnes of Boro paddy (spring crop) from 117 hectares, 1,095 tonnes of jute from 52 hectares, 2,585 tonnes of potatoes from 117 hectares and 2,132 tonnes of sugar cane from 14 hectares. It also produced pulses and oilseeds .

In 2013-14, the total area irrigated in Sreerampur Uttarpara CD Block was 1,776 hectares, out of which 985 hectares were irrigated by canal water, 390 hectares by tank water, 180 hectares by deep tube wells and 221 hectares by shallow tube wells.

Banking
In 2013-14, Sreerampur Uttarpara CD Block had offices of 7 commercial banks.

Transport
Sreerampur Uttarpara CD Block has 5 originating/ terminating bus routes.

The Howrah-Bardhaman main line passes through this CD Block and there are stations at Uttarpara, Hind Motor, Konnagar, Rishra, Shrirampur, Sheoraphuli and Baidyabati. The stations located in the cities/ municipal towns are outside the CD Block.

It is part of Kolkata Suburban Railway system.

Education
In 2013-14, Sreerampur Uttarpara CD Block had 51 primary schools with 5,053 students, 6 high schools with 2,287 students and 10 higher secondary schools with 8,872 students. Sreerampur Uttarpara CD Block had 1 general college with 2,366 students and 182 institutions for special and non-formal education with 3,303 students

In Sreerampur Uttarpar CD Block, amongst the 13 inhabited villages, all villages had a school, 7 villages had more than 1 primary school, 4 villages had at least 1 primary and 1 middle school and 3 villages had at least 1 middle and 1 secondary school.

Healthcare
In 2014, Sreerampur Uttarpara CD Block had 1 block primary health centre and 2 primary health centres with total 85 beds and 4 doctors (excluding private bodies). It had 25 family welfare subcentres. 14,030 patients were treated indoor and 172,915 patients were treated outdoor in the hospitals, health centres and subcentres of the CD Block.

Sreerampur Uttarpara CD Block has Kanaipur Rural Hospital (with 30 beds) at Kanaipur and Rajyadharpur Primary Health Centre (with 10 beds).

Sreerampur Uttarpara CD Block is one of the areas of Hooghly district where ground water is affected by moderate level of arsenic contamination. The WHO guideline for arsenic in drinking water is 10 mg/ litre, and the Indian Standard value is 50 mg/ litre. In Hooghly district, 16 blocks have arsenic levels above WHO guidelines and 11 blocks above Indian standard value. The maximum concentration in Sreerampur Uttarpara CD Block is 200 mg/litre.

References

Community development blocks in Srirampore subdivision